Ut est rerum omnium magister usus (roughly "experience is the teacher of all things" or more generally "experience is the best teacher") is a quote attributed to Julius Caesar in De Bello Civili, the war commentaries of the Civil War. Since then the phrase has become a common saying regarding learning and leadership.

Commentary
John C. Maxwell stated that the only way of learning from personal experiences is to reflect on them, something he feels Caesar had done a lot of, which was the only way he was able to become successful and write down his thoughts.

See also
 Alea iacta est
 Veni, vidi, vici
List of Latin phrases

References

External links

 Is experience the best teacher? on Association for Biblical Higher Education

Latin quotations
Quotes by Julius Caesar